Ashish Bose (12 July 1930 – 7 April 2014) was a prominent Indian demographer and economic analyst. He was Honorary (Emeritus) Professor at the Institute of Economic Growth in Delhi, where he headed the Population Research Centre for several years. He is credited with coining the term BIMARU for Bihar, Madhya Pradesh, Rajasthan and Uttar Pradesh collectively.

Through his long academic career, he lectured extensively on demography across the world, and taught at New Delhi's Jawaharlal Nehru University, the National Academy of Administration, Mussoorie and the National Defence College, New Delhi.

A member of several government commissions on population and development issues, Prof Bose was a keen participant in international conferences on these issues in India and abroad. He was advisor on demographic and census issues to various Indian prime ministers starting with Rajiv Gandhi. The author and editor of 25  books, he was a regular contributor to the Economic and Political Weekly, Health for the Millions and Power Politics.

Death
Bose died on the 7th of April 2014 from complications after hip-replacement surgery following a fall.

References

External links
 Home
 A Story Of Many People | Outlook India Magazine
 We don't need a poverty line: Ashish Bose
 Ashish Bose | The man who coined the term 'Bimaru'

1930 births
2014 deaths
20th-century Indian economists
Indian demographers
Academic staff of Jawaharlal Nehru University
Bengali Hindus